Greendale Township is a civil township of Midland County in the U.S. state of Michigan.  As of the 2000 census, the township population was 1,788.

History
In 1875 Col William L Sterns and other men from Berea, Ohio platted a place in the township called Central City.  The effort to form this city failed and the area is now known as Oil City.

Communities
It is home to an annual Rock & Reggae Music Festival. The name comes from the oil refineries around the area, which arose during an oil boom in the 1920s.

Geography
The Rock-N-Reggae is hosted by Salt River Acres Campground, the campground has also hosted the Salt River Bluegrass Festival for over 30 years.

Demographics
As of the census of 2000, there were 1,788 people, 616 households, and 482 families residing in the township. There were 646 housing units at an average density of 17.9 per square mile (6.9/km2). The racial makeup of the township was 95.81% White, 0.28% African American, 1.45% Native American, 0.28% Asian, 0.62% from other races, and 1.57% from two or more races. Hispanic or Latino of any race were 1.90% of the population.

There were 616 households, out of which 41.6% had children under the age of 18 living with them, 62.2% were married couples living together, 10.4% had a female householder with no husband present, and 21.6% were non-families. 18.5% of all households were made up of individuals, and 6.3% had someone living alone who was 65 years of age or older.  The average household size was 2.90 and the average family size was 3.24.

In the township the population was spread out, with 31.9% under the age of 18, 7.8% from 18 to 24, 33.1% from 25 to 44, 19.8% from 45 to 64, and 7.3% who were 65 years of age or older.  The median age was 32 years. For every 100 females, there were 93.9 males.  For every 100 females age 18 and over, there were 98.5 males.

The median income for a household in the township was $33,587, and the median income for a family was $36,776. Males had a median income of $32,000 versus $21,250 for females. The per capita income for the township was $14,522.  About 10.3% of families and 13.7% of the population were below the poverty line, including 18.7% of those under age 18 and 7.0% of those age 65 or over.

References

Notes

Sources

Townships in Midland County, Michigan
Townships in Michigan
1882 establishments in Michigan
Populated places established in 1882